Michael John Morris (20 January 1943 – 15 March 2020) was an English footballer who played as a forward. He spent time with Barking, Grays Athletic, West Ham United (without making a first-team appearance), and Faversham Town, before he joined Oxford United in 1964. He helped the club to win promotion out of the Fourth Division in 1964–65, before he moved on to Port Vale in July 1967. He helped the "Valiants" to also win promotion out of the Fourth Division in 1969–70, before he was moved on to Stafford Rangers in May 1972. After five years with Rangers he ended his career at Leek Town.

Career
Morris played for Barking (Isthmian League), Grays Athletic, West Ham United (without making a first-team appearance), and Faversham Town, before he joined Oxford United in June 1964. He helped Arthur Turner's "U's" to win promotion out of the Fourth Division in the 1964–65 campaign. United managed to establish themselves in the Third Division in 1965–66 and 1966–67. He scored 15 goals in 90 league games during his time at the Manor Ground.

Morris signed with Stanley Matthews's Port Vale in July 1967, having cut short his honeymoon in Spain in order to join the club. He scored six goals in 31 appearances in the 1967–68 season and scored five goals in 38 games during the 1968–69 season. He then found himself as a utility player at Vale Park under manager Gordon Lee, and missed just two of the "Valiants" 52 games in the 1969–70 Fourth Division promotion-winning campaign. He nevertheless had a fractured relationship with Lee. Morris was ever-present in the 1970–71 season, scoring eight goals in 48 appearances. He then scored three goals in 33 games in the 1971–72 campaign. The chant “We’ve got Micky, Micky Morris on the wing" was frequently sung on the terraces. He was given a free transfer in May 1972, after becoming disillusioned with Lee's defensive tactics. He then spent five years with nearby Northern Premier League side Stafford Rangers; he appeared for them at Wembley in the 1976 FA Trophy defeat to Scarborough. He later played for Leek Town and Jubilee W.M.C.

Personal life
After retiring as a player he settled in North Staffordshire. He also ran the first ten Potteries marathons, as well as twice in the London Marathon. In 2002, he underwent a double heart bypass operation. His wife, Avis, died in 2008. He was diagnosed with dementia in 2012 and died on 15 March 2020, leaving behind children Andrew and Laura.

Career statistics
Source:

Honours
Oxford United
Football League Fourth Division fourth-place promotion: 1964–65

Port Vale
Football League Fourth Division fourth-place promotion: 1969–70

Stafford Rangers
FA Trophy runner-up: 1976

References

Footballers from Plaistow, Newham
English footballers
Association football forwards
Association football utility players
Barking F.C. players
Grays Athletic F.C. players
West Ham United F.C. players
Faversham Town F.C. players
Oxford United F.C. players
Port Vale F.C. players
Stafford Rangers F.C. players
Leek Town F.C. players
Isthmian League players
English Football League players
Northern Premier League players
1943 births
2020 deaths